One Inch Punch (aka One-Inch-Punch) was an American alternative duo from Los Angeles, California, United States, consisting of former Justin Warfield Supernaut members  Justin Warfield and Gianni Garofalo, with Warfield now being part of the darkwave music duo She Wants Revenge.

Biography
The band, often erroneously assumed to be named after the one inch punch technique made famous by Bruce Lee, was actually named after an office supply frontsman Justin Warfield saw while looking for inspiration at the office supply store Staples. The band was officially formed in 1995 and found some success in the UK. Its only album, Tao of the One Inch Punch, was released in September 1996 on Hut Records.

The group's song "Pretty Piece of Flesh" was featured on the Romeo + Juliet soundtrack, and the track "Gemini" was featured on The Edukators soundtrack.

Discography

Tao of the One Inch Punch is the first and only album released by the band in 1996.

Track listing 
 "Just Enough" – 3:29
 "Gemini" – 3:58
 "Latitudes" – 1:35
 "Represent" – 2:55
 "The Bu" – 3:30
 "Take It in Stride" – 3:44
 "Metaphysics" – 3:12
 "Wallflower" – 4:20
 "Orson Welles' Martians" – 4:41
 "If" – 3:31

Appearances in media
 "Pretty Piece of Flesh" was featured on the Romeo + Juliet soundtrack
 "Gemini" was featured on The Edukators soundtrack (2004).

References

Musical groups from Los Angeles
Virgin Records artists